László Földes (born 1959) is a Hungarian architect.

He studied architecture at the Technical University of Budapest, where he received his degree in 1985. After that he held a scholarship at the Helsinki University of Technology. One year later, in 1989 he returned to Finland to work in the Kari Järvinen-Timo Airas architect studio. He founded his own architectural firm in 1994 in Budapest.

His most important works include the Forest School in Visegrád (with Gábor Turányi), the gymnasium of Toldy High School located next to the slope of Buda Castle, W.E.T. Innovation Center in Pilisszentiván, and three dwelling houses in Maassluis, the Netherlands. First time in the world he built in his dwelling house at Szilas-brook, Budapest the Red dot design award-winner "light transmitting concrete" (LiTraCon) invented by a young Hungarian architect, Áron Losonczi.

He was elected to UIA (International Union of Architects) Council on the General Assembly held in Turin, Italy, July 2008.

Awards
 1985		Diploma Prize, Apartment building, Király Street, Budapest
 1997		Pro Architectura Award (Forest School in Visegrád)
 2004		Toldy 150 emlékérem, (Toldy Gimnázium tornaterme)
 2004		Pro Architectura Award (WET Innovation Center, Pilisszentiván (now: Gentherm Hungary Kft.)
 2005		Fair Play Award, NOC of Hungary, "Action Category", Toldy High School
 2005		Media Architecture Award (Dwelling house + light - transmitting concrete))
 2006		Ybl Miklós Award
 2011		"House of the Year 2011", (House with steel porch, Nagykovácsi)

Design competitions 

 1999		3 houses – Maassluis, Netherlands – invited competition - I. place
 2004		High Court of Justice and Attorney General's Office – Győr - national competition - II. place 
 2006		Reformatic Church, Nagykovácsi- invited competition – II. place
 2006		Paks, Erzsébet Hotel - invited competition – shared I. place 
 2007		Ritz-Carlton Hotel, Budapest, Vigadó Street - invited competition- II. place
 2008		Balatonalmádi Health Center - invited competition – I. place 
 2009		Kemenes Vulcanopark Visitor Center, Celldömölk - open competition - I. place
 2010		Enlargement of National Museum, national competition - III. place 
 2010		Pestszentimre, Kindergarten, national competition - I. place

Exhibitions 

 1996		Piran, Piran days of architecture, Forest School in Visegrád
 2002		Piran, Piran days of architecture, WET Innovation Center
 2003		Budapest, Műcsarnok, „Közben”
 2004		London, RIBA, „Hungarian Architecture Today”, WET Innovation Center
 2004		Glasgow, Lighthouse „Hungarian Architecture Today”, WET Innovation Center 
 2004		Leiden, Freiburg, Graz, Kolozsvár, Tranzit 15 traveling exhibition, FL interview, videoinstallation
 2005		Berlin, DAZ, „Emerging Identities! East”, Gym  of Toldy High School Gym
 2006		Budapest Historical Museum, Three centuries of the Györgyi-Giergl Families
 2006		Budapest, N&n Galéria, Lane schedule, independent exhibition
 2010		Budapest, Műcsarnok, Modellfest
 2013		Piran, Piran days of architecture, Kemenes Volcanopark
 2014		Budapest, Műcsarnok, I. Architectural National Salon; Sauflon, Kemenes Volcanopark

Hungarian projects 

 1996		Forest School, Visegrád, „Pro Architectura Award” (Turányi, Földes, Göde,)
 1999		Tree houses, Maassluis, Hollandia (Földes, Pethő)
 2002		W.E.T. Innovation Center (today: Gentherm Hungary Kft.), Pilisszentiván, „Pro Architectura Award” (Pethő, Földes)
 2004		Dwelling house, Budapest, „Media Architectural Award” (Földes)
 2004		Gym of Toldy Gimnázium, Budapest, „Pro Architectura Award” (Földes, Mórocz)
 2005		Ladányi house, Nagykovácsi, realized, (Földes)
 2006		Residential building, Budapest, realized, (Földes, Gönczi)
 2006		Lisznyai Street, Attic building, Budapest (Földes, Fuferenda, Abou Abdo)
 2006		High Court of Justice, Debrecen, realized, (Koller, Csatai, Földes, Pethő)
 2007		Szegvár, renovation of County Hall, licensing plan, monument (Földes, Mórocz)
 2008	Mikos Castel Hotel, Mikosszéplak, licensing plan, monument (Földes, Balogh)
 2009		Etyek, urban study plan, (Földes, Sugár, Losonczi)
 2009		„L” house, Lábatlan, realized, (Földes, Gönczi)
 2009		House with steel porch, Nagykovácsi „House of the Year 2011” (Földes, Balogh)
 2010		Toldy High School, reconstruction of the main building, I. phase, realized, (Földes, Vértesy)
 2011		Archbishop’s Palace in Eger, Visitor Center, construction plan, monument (Földes, Farkas, Vértesy) 
 2011		Zsámbék, Nursery, realized, (Földes, Balogh) 
 2011		Balatonalmádi Health Center, realized, (Földes, Balogh) 
 2011		Steel-terrace house, Budapest (Földes, Holics, Csűri)
 2012		Nagykovácsi, chapel reconstruction, realized (Földes, Golda)
 2012	Szabadkígyós, Wenckheim Castel, licensing plan, monument (Földes, Balogh)
 2012	Kiskőrös, János Vitéz Visitor Center, licensing plan (Földes, Balogh, Szlabey)
 2013	Keszthely, Amazon house interior design, tenderplan, monument (Földes, Szlabey, Deigner)
 2013	Keszthely Festetics Castel interior design, tenderplan, monument (Földes, Szlabey, Balogh)
 2013	Keszthely, Festetics Kastély Castel, tenderplan, monument (Csontos, Balogh, Földes)
 2013	Gyula, Almásy-Wenckheim Castel, construction plan, monument (Földes, Balogh) 
 2013	The Long Brick House, Pilisborosjenő, (Földes, Sónicz)
 2013	Black and White ház, Budaörs, (Földes, Sónicz)
 2013		Graphisoft Dormitory and Incubatorhouse, Budapest, study plan (Földes, Sirokai)
 2013	Zirci Abbey, Visitor Center, installation, monument (Szlabey, Vértesy, Földes)
 2013	Egervár, Nádasdy-Széchenyi Castely, interior design, monument (Szlabey, Vértesy, Földes)
 2013	Kemenes Volcanopark Visitor Center, Celldömölk (Földes, Balogh, Tatár-Gönczi)
 2013	Sauflon Center of Innovation, Gyál, Hungary, (Földes, Csűri, Holics)
 2013	Nagykovácsi, Nursery, construction plan (Földes, Sónicz)
 2014		Tihany, Old Port (Földes, Farkas, Sugár)

Foreign projects 
 1990		Residential Houses, Jollas, Helsinki (Airas)
 1991		School, Imatran Koulu, Finnország (Järvinen, Airas, Himanen)
 1991		School, Mankkaan Koulu, Espoo (Järvinen, Airas)	
 1999		Three houses, Maassluis, Hollandia (Földes, Pethő)
 2007		Sports center and hotel, design project, Vyborg, Oroszország (Jankovics, Deák, Földes)

Selected publications
 1997		Domus N/795 (Milano), Forest School in Visegrád
 1999		World Architecture’80, (London), Forest School in Visegrád
 1999		Octogon, ‘99/1, Tree houses Maasslouis, Hollandia, (Budapest)
 2000		History of Hungary’s Architecture, (szerző: Sisa, Wiebenson)
 2002		5 Houses, Venice Biennale, book, (Budapest)
 2005		L’industria delle costruzioni (Italy) 
 2005		Weltweite Objekte (Germany) 
 2006		Brick’06, Callwey (München), Gym of Toldy High School
 2007		Atlas 2000, Global Architecture, book (Bilbao) 
 2008		Brick’08 Callwey (München)
 2012		A10 new European architecture, No.45. (Amsterdam), Nursery in Zsámbék
 2014		ORIS (Croatia), Sauflon Center of Innovation
 2014		Piranesi, Kemenes Volcanopark Visitor Center
 2014		Brick’14, Nursery in Zsámbék

External links 
 Földes Architects
 Archdaily
 Dezeen
 Architizer
 light-transmitting concrete, Aron Losonczi's webpage
 epiteszforum.hu
 interview with Laszlo Foldes on epiteszforum.hu
 Three centuries of the Györgyi-Giergl Families
 Website of Kemenes Volcanopark Visitor Center
 International Union of Architects

Hungarian architects
1959 births
Living people